Apartheid was a system of racial segregation in South Africa.

Apartheid (crime) is a crime defined in international law

South African apartheid
 Apartheid legislation, laws passed in South Africa to institutionalise racial discrimination

Other uses
Allegations of apartheid by country
 Gender apartheid, economic and social discrimination because of gender
 Global apartheid, argument that the global order imposes a kind of apartheid on people from the Global South
 Israel and apartheid, article on the use of the term "apartheid" in regards to Israeli government policy towards Palestinians.
 Apartheid wall, Palestinian name for the Israeli West Bank barrier
 Malaysia and the crime of apartheid, the treatment of non-bumiputera citizens and women (gender apartheid) in Malaysia as part of Ketuanan Melayu
 Occupational apartheid, the concept that people can be deprived of meaningful work through segregation
 Racial segregation in the United States
 Religious apartheid, separation of people according to their religion
 Social apartheid, segregation on the basis of class or economic status
 Social apartheid in Brazil, various aspects of economic inequality in Brazil
 Technological apartheid, the denial of modern technologies to Third World or developing nations

See also
 Apartheid Convention, international treaty to prevent apartheid
 Jim Crow laws, state and local laws enforcing racial segregation in the southern United States
 Palestine: Peace Not Apartheid, a 2006 book by Jimmy Carter